Leon Eckert (born 9 April 1995) is a German politician of the Alliance 90/The Greenswho has been serving as a member of the Bundestag since the 2021 German federal election, representing the Freising district.

Political career
In parliament, Eckert serves on the Committee on Internal Affairs and the Audit Committee.

Other activities
 German Foundation for Active Citizenship and Volunteering (DSEE), Ex-Officio Member of the Board of Trustees (since 2022)
 German Federation for the Environment and Nature Conservation (BUND), Member (since 2021) 
 German United Services Trade Union (ver.di), Member (since 2020)
 German Cyclist’s Association (ADFC), Member (since 2017)

References

External links 
 

Living people
1995 births
Politicians from Munich
21st-century German politicians
Members of the Bundestag for Alliance 90/The Greens
Members of the Bundestag 2021–2025